The Hawaii Ocean Time-series (HOT) program is a long-term oceanographic study based at the University of Hawaii at Manoa. In 2015, the American Society for Microbiology designated the HOT Program's field site Station ALOHA (A Long-Term Oligotrophic Habitat Assessment;) a "Milestone in Microbiology", for playing "a key role in defining the discipline of microbial oceanography and educating the public about the vital role of marine microbes in global ecosystems." 

Scientists working on the Hawaii Ocean Time-series (HOT) program have been making repeated observations of the hydrography, chemistry and biology of the water column at a station north of Oahu, Hawaii since October 1988. The objective of this research is to provide a comprehensive description of the ocean at a site representative of the North Pacific Subtropical Gyre. Cruises are made approximately once per month to the deep-water Station ALOHA located 100 km north of Oahu, Hawaii. Measurements of the thermohaline structure, water column chemistry, currents, optical properties, primary production, plankton community structure, and rates of particle export are made on each cruise. The HOT program also uses autonomous underwater vehicles, including floats and gliders, to collect data at Station ALOHA between cruises.

Overview
HOT was founded to understand the processes controlling the fluxes of carbon and associated bioelements in the ocean and to document changes in the physical structure of the water column. To achieve this, the HOT program has several specific goals:

1. Quantify temporal (seasonal to decadal) changes in reservoirs and fluxes of carbon and associated bioelements (nitrogen, oxygen, phosphorus, and silicon).

2. Identify processes controlling air-sea carbon exchange, rates of carbon transformation through the planktonic food web, and fluxes of carbon into the ocean.

3. Form a multi-decadal baseline based on the gathered data that will allow researchers to decipher natural and anthropogenic influences on the NPSG ecosystem.

4. Provide scientific and logistical support to other scientific programs that benefit from the research and services performed by the HOT program. This includes projects implementing, testing, and validating new methodologies, models, and transformative ocean sampling technologies.

The dissolved inorganic carbon data set that has been accumulated over the course of the HOT program shows the increase of carbon dioxide in the surface waters of the Pacific and subsequent acidification of the ocean. The data collected by these cruises are available online.

The 200th cruise of the HOT program  was in 2008. HOT recently celebrated its 25th year in operation, with the 250th research cruise occurring in March 2013.

Station ALOHA
Station ALOHA is a deep water (~4,800 m) location approximately 100 km north of the Hawaiian Island of Oahu.  Thus, the region is far enough from land to be free of coastal ocean dynamics and terrestrial inputs, but close enough to a major port (Honolulu) to make relatively short duration (less than five days) near-monthly cruises logistically and financially feasible. Sampling at this site occurs within a 10 km radius around the center of the station.

Each HOT cruise begins with a stop at a coastal station south of the island of Oahu, approximately 10 km off Kahe Point (21° 20.6'N, 158° 16.4'W) in 1500 m of water. Station Kahe (termed Station 1) is used to test equipment and train new personnel before departing for Station ALOHA.  Since August 2004, Station ALOHA has also been home to a surface mooring outfitted for meteorological and upper ocean measurements; this mooring, named WHOTS (also termed Station 50), is a collaborative project between Woods Hole Oceanographic Institution and HOT.  WHOTS provides long-term, high-quality air-sea fluxes as a coordinated part of HOT, contributing to the program’s goals of observing heat, fresh water and chemical fluxes.  In 2011, the ALOHA Cabled Observatory (ACO) became operational.  This instrumented fiber optic cabled observatory provides power and communications to the seabed (4728 m).  The ACO is currently configured with an array of thermistors, current meters, conductivity sensors, two hydrophones, and a video camera.

Field sampling strategy
A core suite of environmental variables was selected at the start of the program that is expected to display detectable change on time scales of several days to one decade. Since 1988, the interdisciplinary station work has included physical, chemical, biological and sedimentological observations and rate measurements. The initial phase of the HOT program (October 1988 – February 1991) was entirely supported by research vessels, with the exception of the availability of existing satellite and ocean buoy sea surface data. In February 1991, an array of inverted echosounders (IES) was deployed around Station ALOHA and in June 1992, a sequencing sediment trap mooring was deployed a few km north of it. In 1993, the IES network was replaced with two strategically positioned instruments: one at Station ALOHA and the other at the coastal station Kaena. A physical-biogeochemical mooring (known as HALE-ALOHA) was deployed from January 1997 to June 2000 for high frequency atmospheric and oceanic observations.

HOT relies on the University-National Oceanographic Laboratory System research vessel Kilo Moana operated by the University of Hawaii for most of the near-monthly sampling expeditions. When at Station ALOHA, a variety of sampling strategies is used to capture the range of physical and biogeochemical dynamics natural to the NPSG ecosystem. These strategies include high resolution conductivity-temperature-depth (CTD) profiles, biogeochemical analyses of discrete water samples, in situ vertically profiling bio-optical instrumentation, free-drifting arrays for determinations of primary production and particle fluxes, deep ocean sediment traps, and oblique plankton net tows.

The suite of core measurements conducted by HOT has remained largely unchanged over the program’s lifetime. On each HOT cruise, samples are collected from the surface ocean to near the sea bed (~4,800 m), with the most intensive sampling occurring in the upper 1,000 m.  HOT utilizes a “burst” vertical profiling strategy where physical and biogeochemical properties are measured at 3 hour intervals over a 36-hour period, covering 3 semi-diurnal tidal cycles and 1 inertial period (~31 hours).  This approach captures variability in ocean dynamics due to internal tides around Station ALOHA. It is designed to assess variability on time scales of a few hours to a few years. High frequency variability (less than 6 hours) and variability on time scales of between 3–60 days are not adequately sampled at the present time.

Scientific findings
This has been accompanied by progressive decreases in seawater pH. Although the effect of anthropogenic  is evidenced by long-term decreases in seawater pH throughout the upper 600 m, the rate of acidification at Station ALOHA varies with depth. For example, in the upper mesopelagic waters (~160–310 m) pH is decreasing at nearly twice the rate observed in the surface waters. Such depth-dependent differences in acidification are due to a combination of regional differences in time-varying climate signatures, mixing, and changes in biological activity.

See also
 Bermuda Atlantic Time-series Study (BATS)
 Ocean weather station

References

External links
 Hawai'i Ocean Time-Series homepage
 Physical Oceanography Component Homepage
 HOT dataserver

Aquatic ecology
Biological oceanography
Chemical oceanography
Geochemistry
Oceanography
Physical oceanography
Oceanographic Time-Series
University of Hawaiʻi
Projects established in 1988
1988 establishments in Hawaii